Diva is the tenth studio album by Serbian singer Jelena Karleuša. It was released on 11 June 2012 under City Records. The record contains ten tracks entirely produced by Nebojša Arežina and Marko Peruničić from Atelje Trag with lyrics written by Marina Tucaković. Musically, Diva draws from electropop, while incorporating elements of dance-pop, pop-folk and hip-hop in its production and beats, which marked a significant departure from her previous work. Karleuša's vocals were noted for the pioneering use of Auto-tune on most of the songs. The general dark sound of the record is deepened with its lyrical themes of sex, love, adultery and revenge, controversially crossed with occasional references to tradition and religion.

Diva had original circulation of 150,000 copies, which were according to the record label sold during the first twenty four hours, making it the fastest selling release in Serbia.

Background
Following the release of her previous album, JK Revolution, in 2008 Karleuša took a break from music due to pregnancies with her two daughters. In the summer of 2009, however, she released her greatest hits album titled The Diamond Collection. Karleuša then appeared on the Serbian version of Celebrity Big Brother for two days in March and released single "Insomnia" in December.

In May the following year, she held her first concert in the Belgrade Arena called All About Diva Show in front of 15,000 fans. In November, Karleuša released live album from the concert.

In January, she announced her forthcoming record with a holographic performance of "Muškarac koji mrzi žene" (Man Who Hates Women) on the popular late night talk show, called Ami G Show. Then in June, she had another promotional single, "Nova religija" (New Religion), performed live on Big Brother.

Track listing
Credits adapted from Discogs.

Sample credits
"Mikrofon" contains a sample of "Alay" (2009) performed by Subliminal featuring Dana International.
"Pucaj u ljubav" contains a sample of "Mio" (2011) performed by David Bustamante.
"Krimi rad" contains a sample of "Criminel" (2010) performed by TLF featuring Indila.
"Savršen zločin" contains a sample of "Adain Shelach" (2009) performed by Avihu Shabat.
"Insomnia" contains a sample of "Dance Pe Chance" (2008) performed by Sunidhi Chauhan and Labh Janjua.
"Muškarac koji mrzi žene" contains a sample of "Lucifer" (2010) performed by Shinee.
"Duboko ranjena" contains a sample of "Ma Sh'haya Haya" (2011) performed by Maya Bouskilla.
"Nova religija" contains a sample of "Dum Dum" (2010) by Benny Dayal and Himani Kapoor.
"So" contains a sample of "La Terrazza" (2008) performed by Dean Newton featuring Huggy.

Release history

References

2012 albums
City Records albums
Jelena Karleuša albums